William Henry James Comte (10 March 1909 – 30 May 1945) was an Australian rules footballer who played with St Kilda in the Victorian Football League (VFL), and Sandringham in the Victorian Football Association (VFA) during the 1930s.

He fought in World War II with the 2/24th Battalion, Second A.I.F., and died of wounds sustained in action during the 1945 Battle of Tarakan.

Family
The second son of William Thomas Comte (1881–????), and Matilda Comte (1884–1943), née Flowers, William Henry James Comte was born at Moama, in New South Wales on 10 March 1909.

He married Ruby Irene "Connie" Curtis (later, Mrs Jack Shearer) on 31 May 1941. They had one son: John Henry Comte (1942–2018).

Football

Echuca (BFL)
Recruited from the Moama Junior Football Club, he played for the Echuca Football Club (coached by ex-Fitzroy footballer Steve Donnellan) in the Bendigo Football League for three seasons (1927–1929).

He was the club's best and fairest in his first year at the club, and played a number of games over those three seasons for combined Bendigo League teams.

St Kilda (VFL)
Comte usually played as a rover or in defence. He won St Kilda's best and fairest in 1933.

Sandringham (VFA)
Cleared from St Kilda to Sandringham on 13 April 1938, he was only able to play 17 matches over the two years he was with Sandringham (1938–1939), due to the knee injuries that had ended his career at St Kilda.

Military service
He enlisted for service with the Second AIF and served with the 2/24 Australian Infantry Battalion.

Death
He died at Tarakan Island on 30 May 1945 of wounds he sustained in action on 29 May 1945, and was buried at the Labuan War Cemetery.

See also
 List of Victorian Football League players who died in active service

Footnotes

References 
 
 World War Two Service Record: Private William Henry James Comte (VX102248), National Archives of Australia.
 Roll of Honour: Private William Henry James Comte (VX102248), Australian War Memorial.
 Australian Army Casualty List: Victoria: Overseas: Died of Wounds, The Argus, (Wednesday, 27 June 1945), p. 4.

External links 

 
 Harold "Bill" Comte, at The VFA Project.
 Harry Comte, at Boyles Football Photos.
 Commonwealth War Graves Commission: Private William Henry James Comte (VX102248).

Trevor Barker Award winners
1909 births
Australian Army personnel of World War II
Australian military personnel killed in World War II
Australian rules footballers from Victoria (Australia)
St Kilda Football Club players
Echuca Football Club players
1945 deaths
Burials at Labuan War Cemetery
Australian Army soldiers
Military personnel from Victoria (Australia)